The Österreichische Galerie Belvedere is a museum housed in the Belvedere palace, in Vienna, Austria.

The Belvedere palaces were the summer residence of Prince Eugene of Savoy (1663–1736). The ensemble was built in the early eighteenth century by the famous Baroque architect, Johann Lucas von Hildebrandt, and comprises the Upper and Lower Belvedere, with the Orangery and Palace Stables, as well as extensive gardens.

Today, the Belvedere houses the greatest collection of Austrian art dating from the Middle Ages to the present day, complemented by the works of international artists. At the Upper Belvedere, visitors not only encounter artworks drawn from over five hundred years of art history but can also experience the magnificent staterooms. In addition to the Lower and Upper Belvedere, the museum has further sites at Prince Eugene's town palace and the 21er Haus as well as the Gustinus Ambrosi Museum.

The Belvedere's art collection presents an almost complete overview of the development of art in Austria and, thus, an insight into the country's history. The world's largest collection of Gustav Klimt's paintings lies at the heart of the presentation of Art around 1900, on show at the Upper Belvedere. Its highlights are Klimt's paintings, The Kiss (1908) and Judith and the Head of Holofernes (1901), and masterpieces by Egon Schiele and Oskar Kokoschka. Key works of French Impressionism and the greatest collection of Viennese Biedermeier art are further attractions at the museum.

History 
The two Belvedere palaces housed an array of artworks even when they were the summer residence of the art patron and collector, Prince Eugene. After the Prince's death, the Habsburgs acquired some of his collections together with the palaces. Various parts of the imperial art collection were subsequently placed on display at the Belvedere from 1781 onwards. In 1903, the state's "Moderne Galerie" was opened at the Lower Belvedere. After the fall of the Austro-Hungarian monarchy, the Upper Belvedere and the Orangery were converted into museums as well. The Österreichische Galerie (Austrian Gallery), as the museum was named in 1921, came to comprise the Baroque Museum in the Lower Belvedere (opened in 1923), the Gallery of 19th Century Art at the Upper Belvedere (from 1924), and the Modern Gallery at the Orangery (from 1929). The Belvedere's collection of medieval art was first exhibited at the Orangery next to the Lower Belvedere in 1953.

In 1955, after years of rebuilding and renovation, the Upper Belvedere was reopened to the public, showing works by Gustav Klimt, Egon Schiele, Oskar Kokoschka, and other major Austrian artists.

In the years after the Second World War, there were many acquisitions and the museum was expanded and modernized. The Österreichische Galerie Belvedere is today one of the Austrian Federal Museums (Bundesmuseen) and since 2000 has been a vollrechtsfähige "wissenschaftliche Anstalt" (a legally independent public research/scientific institution).

Agnes Husslein, formerly director of the Salzburg Rupertinum and the Museum der Moderne on the Mönchsberg, was director of the Belvedere between 2007 and 2016. She has positioned the Belvedere as a museum of Austrian art in an international context.

Following extensive adaptation and remodelling, the highlights of the collections of medieval and Baroque art (previously in the Lower Belvedere) have been placed on display at the Upper Belvedere since spring 2008. For the first time, the entire scope of the permanent collection, from the Middle Ages to the mid-twentieth century, can now be seen under one roof. The adapted rooms in the Lower Belvedere and Orangery now provide space for temporary exhibitions. Moreover, a study collection of the medieval holdings was set up in the former Palace Stables. The permanent collections were redisplayed in 2011.

Visitor numbers have been increasing steadily during the years of Husslein's directorship and, in 2012, they surpassed the one million mark for the first time (1,088,000 visitors).

Gallery

Nazi-looted art controversies and restitutions 

 On August 26, 1959 Holocaust survivor Alice Morgenstern, the widow of Josef Morgenstern murdered in Auschwitz, filed a claim to the Finanzlandesdirektion für Wien, Niederösterreich und das Burgenland (Provincial Tax Office for Vienna, Lower Austria and Burgenland in which she stated, "the picture Four Trees by Egon Schiele, which used to be owned by us, is now hanging in the Upper Belvedere. We never sold the picture but gave it to a friend, Robert Röhrl, lawyer in Vienna, Gumpendorferstrasse, for safekeeping. He unfortunately died, and I do not know how the picture landed in the nineteenth-century [recte twentieth-century] collection in the Belvedere." On March 20, 2020, the Austrian Advisory Commission recommended that the Schiele be restituted to Morgenstern's heirs 
 In November 2006, after more than five decades of legal disputes, a panel ruled that Edvard Munch's "Summer Night at the Beach", on display at Vienna's Belvedere Gallery, was to be returned to Marina Fistoulari-Mahler, granddaughter and sole heir of Alma Mahler, wife of Austrian composer Gustav Mahler.
 In 2006 Austria returned five paintings by Gustav Klimt, from the Belvedere, to the heirs of Adele Bloch-Bauer.
In 2006 the Austrian arbitration panel decided that the portrait of "Amalie Zuckerkandl" by Gustav Klimt was not looted by the Nazis and did not need to be restituted. The decision caused much commentary, in part because Amalie Zuckerkandl perished with her daughter in Auschwitz and in part because, as MSNBC reported "Rather than return this obviously looted painting, an Austrian arbitration panel concluded that it should stay in the Belvedere."
In 2012 a documentary Portrait of Wally told how Egon Schiele's famous portrait, which had  belonged to a Viennese art dealer named Lea Bondi until the Nazi Friedrich Welz confiscated it from her private collection in 1939, was restituted by mistake to the Belvedere Museum in Austria after World War II as part of another dealer's collection.
In 2014 the Belvedere was ordered to restitute "Farmer's Kitchen / Kitchen Interior" by Wilhelm Leibl to the heirs of Martha Liebermann – Max Liebermann's widow due to Nazi persecution.

References

External links 

 
Virtual tour of the Österreichische Galerie Belvedere provided by Google Arts & Culture

Art museums and galleries in Vienna
Buildings and structures in Landstraße
Art Nouveau collections
Culture in Vienna
Art museums established in 1903
1903 establishments in Austria
20th-century architecture in Austria